The Kırıkkale Subregion (TR71) is a statistical subregion in Turkey.

Provinces 

 Kırıkkale Province (TR711)
 Aksaray Province (TR712)
 Niğde Province (TR713)
 Nevşehir Province (TR714)
 Kırşehir Province (TR715)

See also 

 NUTS of Turkey

External links 
 TURKSTAT

Sources 
 ESPON Database

Statistical subregions of Turkey